Stéphane Houdet defeated Shingo Kunieda in the final, 6–2, 2–6, 7–6(8–6) to win the men's singles wheelchair tennis title at the 2012 French Open. It was his first French Open singles title.

Maikel Scheffers was the defending champion, but was defeated by Kunieda in the quarterfinals.

Seeds
  Maikel Scheffers (quarterfinals)
  Stéphane Houdet (champion)

Draw

Finals

References
Main Draw

Wheelchair Men's Singles
French Open, 2012 Men's Singles